Marquess Wen of Han (Chinese: 韩文侯; pinyin: Hán Wénhóu) (died 377 BC), ancestral name Jì (姬), clan name Hán (韩), personal name unknown, was the ruler of the State of Han between 386 BC and until his death in 377 BC. He was the son of Marquess Lie of Han. Marquess Wen saw a rise in the state's prosperity and consequently launched several military campaigns. In 385 BC, Marquess Wen attacked the State of Zheng and took Yangcheng. In the same year, Han attacked the State of Song, reaching Pengcheng, and took the Duke Dao of Song prisoner. In 380 BC, an alliance of Han, Zhao, and Wei attacked the State of Qi, reaching Sangqiu. 2 years later in 378 BC, the alliance attacked Qi again, reaching Lingqiu. 
Marquess Wen died in 377 BC and was succeeded by his son Marquess Ai of Han.

Ancestors

References

Shiji Chapter 45
Zizhi Tongjian Volume 1

377 BC deaths
Zhou dynasty nobility
Monarchs of Han (state)
Year of birth unknown